The South African Derby is a Group I stakes race for three-year-old Thoroughbred horses, held annually in Johannesburg, South Africa.

Winners 

1907  Diana
1908  Fillette
1909  Adair
1910  Desert Queen
1911  Devinco
1912  Van Raalte
1913  Eiffel Tower
1914  Water Baby
1915  Blanche
1916  Matrimony
1917  Noble Lady
1918  Contentment
1919  Grenade
1920  Colesberg
1921  Dignitary
1922  Antonio
1923  Red Ronald
1924  Catalan
1925  Channel Isle
1926  Asteroid
1927  Just
1928  Step Aside
1929  The Sun
1930  Historian
1931  Meteros
1932  Mussoulini
1933  Sunnite
1934  Night Storm
1935  Moonlit
1936  Stormont
1937  Junior
1938  Hunting Ground
1939  Yale
1940  Lenin
1941  Stonewall
1942  Cropper
1943  Burning Daylight
1944  Cape Heath
1945  Donate
1946  Danny Boy
1947  Fire Brigade
1948  Magic Carpet
1949  Restore
1950  Dancing Flame
1951  River Ferry
1952  Beacon Light
1953  Strath Pearl
1954  Nagaina Hall
1955  Radical
1956  Preacher
1957  Tiger Fish
1958  Hengist
1959  Airy Elf
1960  Open Sea
1961  Carlisle
1962  Hifrac
1963  Ptolemy
1964  King Willow
1965  Bridesman
1966  Appointment
1967  Bill Bailey
1968  Home Guard
1969  Lightning Path
1971  Pedlar
1972  Elevation
1973  Riboville
1974  Bright Future
1975  Distinctly
1976  Black Bishop
1977  Tribesman
1978  Welcome Boy
1979  Artistry
1980  Smuggler's Den
1981  Secret Service
1982  Oakland Bay
1983  Kwiktan
1984  Sandfly
1985  Be Noble (NZ)
1986  Potomac (ARG)
1987  Pedometer
1988  Debonair Duke
1989  Kadarko
1990  Topa Inca
1991  Sacred Jungle 
1992  Launching Pad
1993  Hidden Fortune
1994  The Monk
1995  Travel North
1996  Super Quality
1997  North by Northwest
1998  Kale
1999  Horse Chestnut
2000  Silver Sliver
2001  Badger's Drift
2002  Timber Trader (NZ)
2003  Yard Arm
2004  Grey's Inn (USA)
2005  Silverpoint (AUS)
2006  Elusive Fort
2007  Ravishing
2008  King's Gambit
2009  Bouquet-Garni
2010  Irish Flame
2011  Seal
2012  Pomodoro, Royal Bencher
2013  Wylie Hall
2014  Louis The King
2015  Legal Eagle
2016  Abashiri
2017  Al Sahem
2018  Hero's Honour
2019  Samurai Warrior
2020  Out Of Your League
2021 Malmoos
2022  Aragosta

References
TurfHallmarks

Horse races in South Africa
Flat horse races for three-year-olds
Sports competitions in Johannesburg
Recurring sporting events established in 1907